Whiplash was a British/Australian television series in the Australian Western genre, produced by the Seven Network, ATV, and ITC Entertainment, and starring Peter Graves. Filmed in 1959-60, the series was first broadcast in the United Kingdom in September 1960, and in Australia in February 1961.

Overview
Set during the Australian gold rushes of the 1850s, the series was inspired by the life of Freeman Cobb, founder of the iconic Australian stagecoach line, Cobb and Co. However, the characters and events in the series bore no resemblance to the real Freeman Cobb or his company. Freeman Cobb did not carry a pistol or use a stockwhip to settle disputes.

The series was created by Michael Noonan and Michael Plant, and produced by Maurice Geraghty and Ben Fox at the Artransa Studios in Sydney, which were owned by ATV. Post-production was completed in the United Kingdom.

Cast and characters
 Peter Graves as Christopher Cobb
 Anthony Wickert as Dan Ledward

Leading player, Peter Graves, was best known at the time for the TV Western Fury.

Australian actors who guest starred included Leonard Teale, Terry McDermott, Chips Rafferty and Peter Aanensen, as well as Indigenous actors Robert Tudawali and Henry Murdoch.

Other actors with memorable appearances, and not included in episode list below, included comedian George Wallace Jnr, and Chuck Faulkner.

In his autobiography, associate producer and director of many episodes John Meredyth Lucas commented on the difficulty faced in casting the series. He wrote that actors with radio experience were generally used, because of concerns with the broad Australian accents of some performers. On his return to the US in October 1960, Graves also commented on the difficulty in finding actors. "Those we got were very good, but there just wasn't enough of them," he said.

Episode list
The original air date is for ATV London. ITV regions varied date and order.

Production number refers to the order in the Network DVD booklet.

Background and production

Development 
Michael Noonan had created and written a British TV series shot in Australia called The Flying Doctor. Whiplash was a similar international production. The show was mostly financed by Lew Grade's ITC productions, but was aimed at the international market, leading to many Americans being in key creative roles. Post production was done in the UK.

Co-producing partners included Australia's Artransa Park Studios and Britain's ATV.

Filming
Filming started in October 1959 at Artransa Park Studios in Frenchs Forest, a Sydney suburb, with location work at Scone, New South Wales and elsewhere.

Graves told the Sydney Morning Herald that  
Nearly all the American Westerns are shot within 30 miles of Hollywood and a lot of that scenery is becoming mighty familiar to TV viewers. Now this scenery here is refreshing — something entirely new to folks overseas. We're trying to keep right away from that word 'Western' by labelling the series a romantic adventure.

In his memoirs, Lucas commented on the difficulties faced because of the sometimes inexperienced Australian crew. Production was also initially difficult because of the competing expectations of production partners from three different countries. The production team was restructured from episode six onwards, after which Ben Fox was appointed producer with Leslie Harris as executive producer.

Filming recommenced on 4 March 1960. The budget of the series was a reported £650,000.

In May 1960, it was reported the unit of 22 actors and crew had left Sydney for Alice Springs to film sequences over ten days, including scenes at Ayers Rock, the MacDonnell Ranges and the Ormiston Gorge. By that stage, ten episodes had been shot and the series sold to ATN Channel 7. Fox announced that both American and British television groups were "likely to be very interested in buying the series".

Music
Theme Music: Words and Music by Edwin Astley, sung by Frank Ifield.

Incidental music
Edwin Astley, Albert Elms

Release

Broadcast 
In 1961, it became one of the original twelve programs aired by the new CTV network in Canada, and the only one produced in Australia.

Home media
On 7 December 2009, Network released a Region 2 five-DVD set .

On 18 September 2012, Timeless Media Group released Whiplash - The Complete Series on DVD in Region 1. The 4-disc set featured all 34 episodes of the series.

References

Notes
 "The Australian Film and Television Companion" — compiled by Tony Harrison — Simon & Schuster Australia, 1994
</ref>

External links
 
 Whiplash at Classic Australian Television
 Whiplash at the National Film and Sound Archive
 Whiplash reviewed on VideoVista.net

1961 Australian television series debuts
1961 Australian television series endings
Australian drama television series
ITV television dramas
Seven Network original programming
Television series by ITC Entertainment
Television shows set in colonial Australia
Australian Western (genre) films
Black-and-white Australian television shows
1960s Western (genre) television series